Vlotho is a town in the district of Herford, in North Rhine-Westphalia, Germany.

Geography
Vlotho is located along the Weser river, south of the Wiehengebirge, bordering on the Ravensberger Hügelland in the west, Lipperland in the south, and the Weserbergland in the east. The Weser river runs through the city east to north and thus separates the northeast part of the town, Uffeln, from the rest of the city. The highest point is the Bonstapel at 342 m in the south-east.

Neighbouring municipalities
Vlotho borders on Herford and Löhne in the west, Bad Oeynhausen and Porta Westfalica (both Minden-Lübbecke district) in the north, Kalletal in the east, and Lemgo and Bad Salzuflen (both Lippe district) in the south.

Division of the town
 Exter
 Uffeln
 Valdorf
 Vlotho

History
The first historical records of Vlotho go back to the year 1185. In 1248, Vlotho gained the official status of a city, but lost it again due to both pestilence and war. In the 17th century, Vlotho recovered as a location for industry, most notably paper. During the Thirty Years War, on 17 October 1638 Vlotho was the site of a battle, which resulted in a victory for an Imperial army under the command of Field Marshal Melchior, Count of Hatzfeldt over a Palatinate-Swedish army under the command of Charles Louis of Palatine. In 1650, Vlotho regained the right to hold a market, and in 1719, became an independent city.  A harbour was built and Vlotho became the location of cigar, machine, and textile industry. In 1875, Vlotho station was constructed, and in 1928, a bridge replaced the ferry across the Weser river. In 1969, the old city of Vlotho was unified with the communities of Exter and Valdorf. In 1973, Uffeln (formerly part of the district of Minden) joined Vlotho.

Economy
A major part of the local economy is the emerging tourist industry. There is still some machine industry.

Sightseeing
 Vlotho castle from the 13th century

Notable people 

 Ursula Haverbeck (born 1928), Holocaust denier
 Helmut Rethemeier (born 1939), versatility rider, Olympian participant in 1976 (silver medal winner)
 Heinrich Adolf Rinne (1809–1868), doctor

Notes

References

External links

 Webcam overlooking the town centre 
 Homepage of the yearly festival 
 History of Vlotho and its surroundings 
 Mendel-Grundmann-Gesellschaft e.V. Vlotho 

Herford (district)